Asano Narikata (November 5, 1773 – January 4, 1831) was a Japanese daimyō of the Edo period, who ruled the Hiroshima Domain. His childhood name was Jinnosuke (時之丞) later Zenjirō (善次郎).

Family
 Father: Asano Shigeakira
 Mother: Tokugawa Yokohime (1751–1773), daughter of Tokugawa Munekatsu, 8th Daimyo of Owari Domain
 Wives: 
 Princess Arisugawa no Miya Oriko, daughter of Prince Arisugawa no Miya Orihito
 Tokudaiji Yasuko, daughter of Tokudaiji Kanmichi
 Children:
 Asano Naritaka
 Utahime married Mizoguchi Naoaki of Shibata Domain
 Teruhime married Matsudaira Naonobu of Kawagoe Domain later married Uesugi Narisada of Yonezawa Domain
 Akihime married Hosokawa Narimori of Kumamoto Domain 
 Kumihime married Maeda Toshiyasu of Toyama Domain
 daughter married Akimoto Hisatomo of Yamagata Domain
 Kayohime married Sō Yoshiyori of Tsushima-Fuchū Domain
 daughter married Mizoguchi Naoryo
 Kayoko married Tachibana Akinobu of Yanagawa Domain

See also 
 Hiroshima Domain

References  

1773 births
1831 deaths
Daimyo
Asano clan